Guntur Talkies is a 2016 Indian Telugu-language crime comedy film directed by Praveen Sattaru who co-wrote the film with Siddu Jonnalagadda. The film stars Jonnalagadda, Rashmi Gautam, Shraddha Das, and Naresh. The film was a sleeper hit. It was remade in Tamil as Evanukku Engeyo Matcham Irukku (2018).

Plot 
Hari (Siddu) and Giri (Naresh) live in a slum in Guntur and work as a low-end salesmen in a medical shop managed by a greedy man. They have a secret life of petty thieves. They steal small and insignificant items so that nobody recognizes them and complain to the police. One day both of them steal  of money and run away to Goa. Suddenly they are chased by police and mafia. Rest of the story is about how they escape from them and how they settle in their life.

Cast

 Siddu Jonnalagadda as Hari
 Rashmi Gautam as Suvarna
 Shraddha Das as Revolver Rani
 Naresh as Giri
 Gundu Sudarshan as Medical shop owner
 Mahesh Manjrekar as don Jackie
 Raja Ravindra as Police officer
 Raghu Babu as C.I Ranjit Kumar
 Pavala Syamala as Giri's mother
 Thagubothu Ramesh as Police constable
 Jogi Naidu
 Karate Kalyani
 Jayavani as Suvarna's elder sister
 Apoorva as Roja, Giri's wife
 Snigdha
 Allari Subhashini 
 Lakshmi Manchu (special appearance)
 Jayavani
 Chaitanya Krishna (special appearance)

Soundtrack

References

External links
 
 Guntur Talkies film on Youtube

2016 films
2010s Telugu-language films
2016 black comedy films
2010s heist films
2010s sex comedy films
Indian black comedy films
Indian heist films
Indian sex comedy films
Telugu films remade in other languages
Indian crime comedy films
Films scored by Sricharan Pakala
Films directed by Praveen Sattaru